Ngātīmoti or Ngatimoti is a town near Motueka in New Zealand's South Island.

The town lies on the banks of the Motueka River and has been inhabited since 1855 when the Salisbury brothers arrived in the river valley. The local economy includes forestry, apple orchards and sheep and dairy farming. It is connected to the town of Motueka by the Motueka Valley Highway (formerly ).

History
The name for this community originated after a Māori boy with the Christian baptismal name Timothy (Tīmoti) carved his name into a tree at the corner of what is now Ngatimoti school.

On 1 January 1863 the town featured the first formal gathering of the Brethren religious movement, at the house of a local settler, James George Deck  and by the 1900 census the movement had nearly 2% of the total NZ population. This created a tension between Brethren and Anglican settlers in the valley. The Anglicans sent troops to World War I, while the Brethren adopted a semi-pacifist stance. The first New Zealander to die in the conflict was from Ngātīmoti. An ongoing characteristic of the community is the peaceful coexistence and respect for a wide variety of lifestyles and viewpoints, including conservative farmers, hippies and communes. The town experienced major floods in 1877 and 1990, contributed to by extensive deforestation of the steep surrounding region.

In 2019, the name of the locality was officially gazetted as Ngātīmoti.

Education

Ngatimoti School is a co-educational state primary school for Year 1 to 8 students, with a roll of  The school opened on 17 August 1868.

St James Church
St James is an Anglican church which was erected in 1884. The building is constructed of tōtara and rimu.

References

External links 
 Church gets historic bell back Article from the Nelson Mail, 24/12/2010
Opening of the  Peninsula Bridge on 5 July 1913, and description of the bridge with statistics "Nelson Evening Mail", 7 July 1913, pg 5.
 "Our Place: Mud Houses, Schools and Sundry Remnants" An informal history of Ngatimoti.

Populated places in the Tasman District